Chen Yu-lin (born 21 October 1985 in Lioujia, Tainan) is a Taiwanese football player. Nicknamed Lioujia for his birthplace, some people consider Chen the best left back in Taiwan at present. He has represented Chinese Taipei in the 2007 AFC Asian Cup and the 2010 East Asian Football Championship.

References

External links

1985 births
Living people
Taiwanese footballers
Footballers from Tainan
Chinese Taipei international footballers
Taiwan Power Company F.C. players
Association football fullbacks